PSA, PsA, Psa, or psa may refer to:

Biology and medicine 
 Posterior spinal artery
 Primary systemic amyloidosis, a disease caused by the accumulation of abnormal proteins
 Prostate-specific antigen, an enzyme used as a blood tracer for prostate cancer 
 Psoriatic arthritis (PsA), an inflammatory disease
 Pseudomonas aeruginosa, a species of bacterium
 Pseudomonas syringae pv. actinidiae, a pathovar of a bacterium that attacks kiwifruit

Chemistry 
 Polar surface area, the surface sum over all polar atoms of a molecule
 Pressure swing adsorption, a technology for separating, or purifying, gases

Computing 
 Professional services automation, software for automating project and billing management for professional service firms
 PSA Certified, Platform Security Architecture, a security certification for the Internet of Things
 Plesk Server Administrator, a commercial web hosting automation program
 Persistent staging area, a staging area in data vault modeling

Contracts, legislation, and government 
 Passenger Vessel Services Act of 1886 or Passenger Services Act, US 
 Payment Services Act, Singapore
 Primary statistical area, a collective term for metropolitan, micropolitan, and combined statistical areas
 Problem-solution approach, an approach for assessing inventive step at the European Patent Office
 Production sharing agreement, a contract between a government and a resource extraction company
 Public Safety Act, a law in Jammu and Kashmir
 Public service agreement, UK government department targets for 3-year period
 Public service announcement
 Purchase and sale agreement, an agreement between a buyer and a seller

Organizations

World-wide scope 
 Pacific Science Association
 Pacific Sociological Association
 Philosophy of Science Association
 Pro Snowboarders Association
 Professional Skaters Association
 Professional Squash Association

Specific to large English-speaking countries 
 Australia: 
 Pharmaceutical Society of Australia
 Public Schools Association, Perth
 Public Service Association of NSW, a trade union
 The Salvation Army, Parramatta
 United Kingdom:
 Phone-paid Services Authority
 Political Studies Association, for academics
 Professional Standards Authority for Health and Social Care
 Property Services Agency, former government agency
 United States:
 Partnership for a Secure America
 Photographic Society of America
 Pi Sigma Alpha, college honor society for political science
 Poultry Science Association

Other country-specific organizations 
 Parti Solidaire Africain (Democratic Republic of the Congo), defunct political party
 New Zealand Public Service Association,  trade union
 PSA BPOL a specialised police unit within the Federal Police of Germany
 Petroleum Safety Authority Norway, governmental supervisory authority
 Palestinian Scout Association
 Philippine Statistics Authority
 Philippine Support Association, raising credit for the poor
 Polish Society of Actuaries
 PSA International (Singapore), formerly Port of Singapore Authority
 Public Servants Association of South Africa, trade union
 Partido Socialista de Andalucía (Spain), former name of the Andalusian Party
 Socialist Party of Aragon (Partido Socialista de Aragón), a now defunct Spanish political party
 Authentic Socialist Party (Argentina), Partido Socialista Auténtico
 Public Services Association (Trinidad and Tobago), a trade union
 Partido Socialista Argentino, the Argentine Socialist Party, a now merged Argentinian political party

Transport 
 PSA Airlines, a subsidiary of American Airlines Group
 Pisa International Airport, Pisa, Italy, IATA code PSA
 Pacific Southwest Airlines, US, 1949 to 1988, ICAO code PSA
 Penn Station Access, a planned New York City rail upgrade
 Groupe PSA, Peugeot Société Anonyme, a French multinational automobile manufacturer

Other uses 
 "PSA" (song) by SZA, from the digital-exclusive edition of her second studio album SOS (2022)
 Penal substitution, a theory of atonement in Christianity
 Professional Sports Authenticator (PSA), part of Collectors Universe, an authenticator of sports and trading cards
 Autonomous Socialist Party (disambiguation)
 Pisa language or Asue Awyu, ISO 639-3 code psa
 Piscis Austrinus (Southern Fish) constellation, IAU abbreviation PsA
 Public Storage stock ticker
 Power Station of Art, a contemporary art museum in Shanghai, China
 Pressure-sensitive adhesive
 "PSA", title of an earlier version of the R.E.M. song "Bad Day"